Gavin James Cross (born February 13, 2001) is an American professional baseball outfielder in the Kansas City Royals organization. He played college baseball for the Virginia Tech Hokies.

Amateur career
Cross attended Tennessee High School in Bristol, Tennessee. As a junior in 2018, he hit 12 home runs alongside stealing forty bases, a Tennessee state record. After graduating in 2019, he enrolled at Virginia Tech to play college baseball for the Virginia Tech Hokies.

As a freshman in 2020, Cross started 16 games in which he batted .369 before the season was cancelled due to the COVID-19 pandemic. He briefly played in the Coastal Plain League with the Peninsula Pilots that summer. In 2021, as a redshirt freshman, he hit for the cycle during a game on April 6 versus East Tennessee State University, going 4 for 6 with seven RBIs and a grand slam. Over 51 starts for the season, Cross slashed .345/.415/.621 with 11 home runs and 35 RBIs. He was named to the All-ACC First-Team, making him the first ever Hokie freshman to earn the honor. After the season's end, he was named to the USA Baseball National Collegiate Team. He batted .431 with four home runs and 14 RBIs with Team USA. He also played in seven games for the Brewster Whitecaps of the Cape Cod Baseball League. Cross entered the 2022 season as a top prospect for the upcoming draft. He appeared in 57 games for the season, slashing .328/.411/.660 with 17 home runs, fifty RBIs, and 12 stolen bases. Following the season's end, he traveled to San Diego where he participated in the Draft Combine.

Professional career
The Kansas City Royals selected Cross in the first round with the ninth overall selection of the 2022 Major League Baseball draft. He signed with the Royals, receiving a $5,202,900 signing bonus, the full slot value for the ninth pick. 

Cross made his professional debut with the Rookie-level Arizona Complex League Royals and was promoted to the Columbia Fireflies of the Single-A Carolina League after three games. Over 29 games between both teams, he slashed .312/.437/.633 with eight home runs and 25 RBIs.

Personal life
Cross's father, Adam, played three seasons in the minor leagues with the Pittsburgh Pirates and San Diego Padres organizations.

References

External links
Virginia Tech Hokies bio

2001 births
Living people
People from Bristol, Tennessee
Baseball players from Tennessee
Baseball outfielders
Virginia Tech Hokies baseball players
Brewster Whitecaps players
United States national baseball team players
Arizona Complex League Royals players